Annie Andrews may refer to:

 Annie Dale Biddle Andrews (1885–1940), first woman to earn a Ph.D. in mathematics from the University of California, Berkeley
 Annie B. Andrews (born 1959), US Navy admiral
 Annie Andrews (physician), American pediatrician and political candidate